Thomas Brent Venables (born December 18, 1970) is an American football coach who is the head coach at the University of Oklahoma. He previously served as the defensive coordinator and linebackers coach at Clemson University from 2012 to 2021.

Venables played college football at Kansas State University as a linebacker from 1991 to 1992. Prior to his tenure at Oklahoma, he held various assistant coaching positions at Kansas State University, University of Oklahoma and Clemson University. Venables was awarded the Broyles Award in 2016.

Early life and playing career
Venables was born in Homestead, Florida. From 1989 to 1990, he played linebacker at Garden City Community College then at Kansas State University under head coach Bill Snyder from 1991 to 1992.

Coaching career

Early career
In 1993, Venables began his coaching career at Kansas State University as a graduate assistant. In 1996, Venables was promoted to linebackers coach and served in that capacity until 1998.

Oklahoma
In 1999, Venables began coaching at the University of Oklahoma, where he served as co-defensive coordinator and linebackers coach for the Sooners under head coach Bob Stoops, with whom he previously worked at Kansas State. He shared oversight of the defense with Stoops’ younger brother, Mike Stoops, until Mike became head coach at Arizona in 2004. Venables then became sole defensive coordinator, and was also promoted to associate head coach.

In 2006, he was one of five finalists for the Broyles Award for the nation's top assistant coach.

Clemson
In January 2012, after it was announced that Mike Stoops would be returning to Oklahoma to resume the defensive coordinator position he had held until 2004, Venables accepted the position of defensive coordinator at Clemson, where his salary was expected to be between $750,000 and $1 million. Venables had been previously reported to be a candidate for the head coaching position at a number of schools including Miami, Kansas, Kansas State, and Texas Tech.

On December 6, 2016, Venables was named the winner of the 2016 Broyles Award for the nation's top assistant coach.

Clemson Diehards reported on December 6, 2017, that Venables was the second-highest paid assistant football coach in college football that year, receiving $1.7 million from Clemson. The only coach in this category receiving more money was Dave Aranda of LSU, who was paid $1.8 million.

Oklahoma (second stint)
On December 5, 2021, Venables was named the 23rd head coach at the University of Oklahoma, replacing Lincoln Riley after his departure to become the head coach at the University of Southern California (USC).

Personal life
Venables and his wife, Julie, have four children: sons Jake and Tyler, who played football at Clemson, and daughters Laney and Addie.

Head coaching record

References

External links
 Oklahoma profile
 Clemson profile

Living people
1970 births
American football linebackers
Clemson Tigers football coaches
Garden City Broncbusters football players
Kansas State Wildcats football coaches
Kansas State Wildcats football players
Oklahoma Sooners football coaches
People from Homestead, Florida
Sportspeople from Salina, Kansas
Coaches of American football from Kansas
Players of American football from Kansas